South Shore station is a commuter railroad station in Chicago. Other uses:
 South Shore railway station, a disused railway station in Blackpool, United Kingdom
 South Portsmouth–South Shore station in South Shore, Kentucky
 Any station on the South Shore Line